Taiwan Isuzu Motors Co. (TIM) was founded December 1995 as a commercial vehicle manufacturer with headquarters in Taipei, Taiwan. The company is both the assembler and distributor of vehicles. The company is a joint venture between Isuzu owning 69.5%, and the Prince Motor Company with 20% and the Itochu Shoji with 10.5%. The Taiwanese branch required an investment in the amount of 309.4 million New Taiwan Dollar. Currently, the company employs about 50 workers. The plant management reports to the CEO Yoshirou Shinbo . Each year about 2,500 are trucks for distribution in the local market assembled.

The main task of this work is, however, in the area of logistics, on coordination to assemble vehicle parts. These are suspensions, shock absorbers, vehicle headlights, radio receivers and motors, which are produced by local manufacturers, and then here in the factory for delivery to other works on the so-called semi-knocked-down kits are packaged parts. 

In 2012, Taipei Triangle Motors, a Taiwan subsidiary of Dah Chong Hong in Hong Kong, was appointed as importer and distributor of Isuzu in Taiwan.

Current models

Former models

External links
Taiwan Isuzu Motors

Taiwanese companies established in 1995
Bus manufacturers of Taiwan
Truck manufacturers of Taiwan
Manufacturing companies based in Taipei
Isuzu
Vehicle manufacturing companies established in 1995